Katnarrat or Katnarrat or Katnarat may refer to:
Katnarat, Lori, Armenia
Katnarrat, Syunik, Armenia